The 1989 Kilkenny Senior Hurling Championship was the 95th staging of the Kilkenny Senior Hurling Championship since its establishment by the Kilkenny County Board.

Ballyhale Shamrocks were the defending champions.

Ballyhale Shamrocks won the championship after a 2-11 to 1-13 defeat of Glenmore in the final. It was their eighth championship title overall and their second title in succession.

References

Kilkenny Senior Hurling Championship
Kilkenny Senior Hurling Championship